Minnipuka is an unincorporated place and Dispersed Rural Community in geographic Marjorie Township, in the Unorganized North part of Algoma District in northeastern Ontario, Canada. It is on the Canadian National Railway transcontinental railway main line between the railway points of Neswabin to the west and Dishnish to the east, has a passing track, and is passed but not served by Via Rail transcontinental Canadian passenger trains. The place is on the east side of Minnipuka Lake, part of the Goat River system.

Geographic Minnipuka Township is the township adjacent diagonally to the northeast of Marjorie Township.

History
Minnipuka is part of a section of what was originally the Canadian Northern Railway that was under construction from 1912 to 1913.

References

Other map sources:

Communities in Algoma District